Mae Thalop is a tambon (subdistrict) of Chai Prakan District, in Chiang Mai Province, Thailand. In 2020 it had a total population of 7,930 people.

History
The subdistrict was created effective 1 April 1982 by splitting off 4 administrative villages from Pong Tam.

Administration

Central administration
The tambon is subdivided into 7 administrative villages (muban).

Local administration
The whole area of the subdistrict is covered by the subdistrict administrative organization (SAO) Mae Thalop (องค์การบริหารส่วนตำบลแม่ทะลบ).

References

External links
Thaitambon.com on Mae Thalop

Tambon of Chiang Mai province
Populated places in Chiang Mai province